Kell House may refer to:

Kell House (Tallulah, Louisiana), listed on the National Register of Historic Places (NRHP)
Frank Kell House, Wichita Falls, Texas, NRHP-listed in Wichita County
William H. Kell House, New Richmond, Wisconsin, NRHP-listed in St. Croix County